The 1943–44 1re série season was the 26th season of the 1re série, the top level of ice hockey in France. Chamonix Hockey Club won their 10th championship.

Final
Chamonix Hockey Club - Racing Club de France 5:0 (1:0, 3:0, 1:0)

External links
Season on hockeyarchives.info

Fra
1943–44 in French ice hockey
Ligue Magnus seasons